Timbuctoo is a series of 25 children's books, written and illustrated by Roger Hargreaves, better known for his Mr. Men and Little Miss series. It was published from 1978 to 1979, with selected reprints in 1993 and 1999. The books tell the stories of a group of animals, each of whom is named after the sound that their particular animal makes. An animated series (produced by Flicks Films and Carlton International) of Timbuctoo was shown on CITV which ran from 9 January 1998 to 5 January 2000, narrated by Ronnie Corbett.

Books
The original set of 25 books named after their main character were published in 1978 and 1979, along with board books, shaped story books and three Timbuctoo Annuals. In 1999 eight of the books were reprinted with new illustrations to promote the television show, along with a new character, Bray.

The first twelve books were also published in Dutch, and the eight 1999 versions published in Greek.

1978
Woof (an ochre dog)
Meow (an orange cat)
Oink (a pink pig)
Chirp (a blue bird)
Trumpet (a grey elephant)
Squeak (an ochre mouse)
Moo (a brown cow)
Buzz (a black and yellow bee)
Neigh (a red horse)
Roar (a yellow lion)
Snap (a green crocodile)
Hiss (a yellow-green snake)

Four of the books (Woof, Trumpet, Buzz and Oink) were republished in 1993.

1979
Croak (a green frog)
Cluck (an orange chicken)
Growl (a black and orange tiger)
Honk (a black seal)
Chatter (an orange monkey)
Quack (a white duck)
Sniff (a grey rabbit)
Bleat (an orange goat)
Hoot (a brown owl)
Grizzle (a burgundy bear)
Puff (a black and white panda)
Squawk (a blue parrot)
Baa (a grey and white sheep)

There was also a set of Timbuctoo Shape Books released, including Oink, Neigh, Growl, Roar, Squeak, Trumpet, Cluck and Puff.

1997
Bray (a grey donkey)
Bray was an additional character created and written by Roger's son Adam. This was because standard TV series are often produced in 13 or 26 episode series and an additional character was required to reach 26 episodes. Eight of the original books were reprinted in 1999, with new illustrations, to accompany the TV series. While Bray was listed on the back cover along with the rest of the cast, only Buzz, Cluck, Growl, Meow, Neigh, Oink, Snap and Trumpet were reprinted.

Television adaptation

From 9 January 1998 to 5 January 2000, the TV show ran on CITV for two series based on characters of books; Series 1 was released on VHS as Neigh Finds a New Home and Other Stories in March 1999 and Series 2 released as Woof Has Forgotten How to Bark and Other Stories in February 2000. A total of 26 episodes were produced.

Series Overview
Series 1: 9 January 1998 to 3 April 1998 (13 Episodes)
Series 2: 6 October 1999 to 5 January 2000 (13 Episodes)

Series 1 (1998)
"Neigh Finds a New Home" (9 January 1998)
"Honk Goes Swimming" (16 January 1998)
"Snap Learns a New Game" (23 January 1998)
"Cluck Gets a Letter" (30 January 1998)
"Moo Has a Birthday Party" (6 February 1998)
"Chirp Learns to Fly" (13 February 1998)
"Croak Learns to Swim" (20 February 1998)
"Oink and the Big Apple" (27 February 1998)
"Squeak has a Big Day Out" (6 March 1998)
"Bleat Takes the Ball By the Horns" (13 March 1998)
"Grizzle Gets the Giggles" (20 March 1998)
"Hoot Slips up at Question Time" (27 March 1998)
"Meow Goes Fishing" (3 April 1998)

Series 2 (1999-2000)
"Woof Has Forgotten How to Bark" (6 October 1999)
"Hiss is Hopping Mad" (13 October 1999)
"Chatter and His Long Tail" (20 October 1999)
"Puff Buys Some Paint" (27 October 1999)
"Roar Sets Out to Frighten Timbuctoo" (3 November 1999)
"Trumpet Goes to the Seaside" (10 November 1999)
"Quack Dreams of a New Beak" (17 November 1999)
"Buzz is a Very Busy Bee" (24 November 1999)
"Growl Has a Fright" (1 December 1999)
"Baa Goes Shopping" (8 December 1999)
"Sniff Runs Out of Carrots" (15 December 1999)
"Bray Sleeps Through Christmas" (22 December 1999)
"Squawk Joins the Choir" (5 January 2000)

External links

Timbuctoo character and episode list at Toonhound
Timbuctoo at LibraryThing

Book series introduced in 1978
British picture books
Series of children's books
Fictional islands
ITV children's television shows
1998 British television series debuts
2000 British television series endings
1990s British children's television series
2000s British children's television series
British children's animated adventure television series
British television shows based on children's books
Animated television series about animals
Works by Roger Hargreaves
Children's fiction books
English-language television shows
Television series by ITV Studios
Sanrio characters
1990s British animated television series
2000s British animated television series